The 1913 New South Wales Rugby Football League premiership was the sixth season of Sydney's top-level rugby league club competition, Australia's first. Eight teams from across the city contested during the season.

Season summary
By the start of the 1913 season, the NSWRFL had secured the use of the Sydney Cricket Ground for its games.

As occurred in the 1912 season, the minor premiers were deemed the overall premiers. Eastern Suburbs, who finished top of the table for the second time in as many years, claimed their third straight premiership as a result. The team's success could be attributed to the talent in the team at the time, with ten players having played for Australia and another three for New South Wales. Of the team's two losses, one came at the hands of runners-up Newtown midway through the season and the other in the final round to Glebe after the title had already been won.

This Eastern Suburbs side is still considered to be one of the greatest club teams ever assembled, with players including Dally Messenger, Wally Messenger, Sandy Pearce, Larry O'Malley, Les Cubitt, Dan Frawley and Arthur "Pony" Halloway. This season also saw the retirement from the League of future Australian Rugby League Hall of Fame inductee, Dally Messenger.

Teams
The teams remained unchanged from the previous season.

 Annandale
 Balmain, formed on 23 January 1908 at Balmain Town Hall
 Eastern Suburbs, formed on 24 January 1908 at Paddington Town Hall
 Glebe, formed on 9 January 1908
 Newtown, formed on 14 January 1908
 North Sydney, formed on February 7, 1908, at the North Sydney School of Arts in Mount Street
 South Sydney, formed on 17 January 1908 at Redfern Town Hall
 Western Suburbs, formed on 4 February 1908

Ladder

Records set in 1913
On 19 July, South Sydney's reserve grade team scored 102 points against Mosman, which remains the greatest number of points scored in any grade of NSWRFL/NSWRL/ARL/NRL rugby league. The Rabbitohs scored 49 points in the first half and 59 in the second, conceding only a solitary penalty goal.

References

External links
 Rugby League Tables - Notes AFL Tables
 Rugby League Tables - Season 1913 AFL Tables
 Premiership History and Statistics RL1908
 1913 - Eastern Suburbs Make It Three In A Row RL1908
Results: 1911-20 at rabbitohs.com.au

New South Wales Rugby League premiership
Nswrfl Season